Pseudostegania defectata is a moth in the family Geometridae. It is found in the Russian Far East and Japan.

The wingspan is 21–25 mm.

References

Moths described in 1881
Asthenini
Moths of Japan
Moths of Asia